The Barycz is a river in Greater Poland and Lower Silesian Voivodeships in western Poland. It is a right tributary of the Odra River. The river course roughly marked the northern border of the historic region of Lower Silesia with Greater Poland.

The Barycz has a length of 136 km and a basin area of 5,547 km². The surrounding terrain of the Barycz Valley Landscape Park is an important wetland reserve. Settlements on the Barycz include Odolanów, Milicz, Sułów, Żmigród, and Wąsosz.  The Orla is among its tributaries.

See also 
Rivers of Poland

References

External links 
The Barycz River Valley

Rivers of Greater Poland Voivodeship
Rivers of Lower Silesian Voivodeship
Rivers of Poland